Brandin Bryant (born September 16, 1993) is an American football defensive tackle for the Buffalo Bills of the National Football League (NFL).  He played college football at Florida Atlantic and was signed by the Seattle Seahawks as an undrafted free agent in 2016.

College career
Bryant first went to college at Fort Scott Community College as a redshirt freshman. He transferred to Florida Atlantic University, where he would be a starter for the following four seasons. He majored in communication and political science. During his junior season, he returned to Nebraska, where his grandfather had played in the mid-1950s. Over his four-year collegiate career, he totaled 121 total tackles (25.0 for a loss), 12.5 sacks, 2 passes defended and a forced fumble. He earned FAU's comeback player of the year award during the 2015 season.

Professional career

Seattle Seahawks
Bryant was signed by the Seattle Seahawks as an undrafted free agent on May 6, 2016. He played in all four of their preseason games, compiling 3 total tackles. On September 3, 2016, Bryant was waived by the Seahawks.

New York Jets
On October 24, 2016, Bryant was signed to the New York Jets' practice squad. He was promoted to the active roster on December 20, 2016.

On August 4, 2017, Bryant was waived/injured by the Jets and placed on injured reserve. He was waived from IR on August 9, 2017.

Cleveland Browns
Bryant signed with the Cleveland Browns on August 9, 2019. He was waived on August 31, 2019 and was signed to the practice squad the next day. The Browns elevated Bryant to their active roster on November 22, 2019. He was waived on December 21, 2019 and re-signed to the practice squad. The Browns signed Bryant to their reserve/futures list on December 30, 2019. Bryant was waived by the Browns on May 8, 2020.

Miami Dolphins
Bryant was signed by the Miami Dolphins on August 12, 2020. He was placed on the reserve/COVID-19 list by the team on August 15, 2020, and activated the next day. He was waived on September 5, 2020.

Buffalo Bills
On September 17, 2020, Bryant was signed to the Buffalo Bills practice squad. He was elevated to the active roster on October 31 for the team's week 8 game against the New England Patriots, and reverted to the practice squad after the game. On January 26, 2021, Bryant signed a reserves/futures contract with the Bills. He was waived on August 31, 2021 and re-signed to the practice squad the next day.

After the Bills were eliminated in the Divisional Round of the 2021 playoffs, Bryant signed a reserve/future contract on January 24, 2022.

On August 30, 2022, Bryant was waived by the Bills and signed to the practice squad the next day. He was promoted to the active roster on September 24. He was released on November 1.

Houston Texans
On November 7, 2022, Bryant was signed to the Houston Texans practice squad. He was released on December 12.

Buffalo Bills (second stint)
On December 13, 2022, the Buffalo Bills signed Bryant to the 53-man roster. On December 19 he was released. On December 21, he was re-signed to the practice squad. He signed a reserve/future contract on January 23, 2023.

References

External links
Cleveland Browns bio
Florida Atlantic Owls bio

1993 births
Living people
American football defensive ends
Buffalo Bills players
Cleveland Browns players
Florida Atlantic Owls football players
New York Jets players
Players of American football from Nebraska
Seattle Seahawks players
Miami Dolphins players
Sportspeople from Omaha, Nebraska
Winnipeg Blue Bombers players
Omaha North High School alumni
Houston Texans players